Fernando Iwasaki Cauti (born 1961, in Lima) is a Peruvian writer and historian.

Born into a family with multiple roots (Japan, Ecuador and Italy). While in Peru, he taught at the Pontificia Universidad Católica del Perú and the Universidad del Pacífico in Lima. Since 1989, he has lived in Seville.

Iwasaki has published more than 20 volumes of fiction and non-fiction. He contributes regularly to various newspapers and magazines. His work has been translated into half a dozen languages, including Russian, English, French, Italian, Romanian and Korean.

Selected works

Novels    
 Neguijón (Alfaguara, 2005) 
 El libro de buen amor (RBA, 2001),

Short stories
 España, aparta de mí estos premios (Páginas de Espuma, 2009), 
 Helarte de amar (Páginas de Espuma, 2006), 
 Ajuar funerario (Páginas de Espuma, 2004), 
 Un milagro informal (Alfaguara, 2003), 
 Inquisiciones Peruanas (Renacimiento, 1997), 
 A Troya, Helena (Los Libros de Hermes, 1993) 
 Tres noches de corbata (AVE, 1987). 
 Papel Carbón (Páginas de Espuma, 2012)

Essays and articles
 Nabokovia Peruviana (La Isla de Siltolá, 2011), 
 Arte de introducir (Renacimiento, 2011), 
 rePUBLICANOS (Algaba Essay Prize, 2008), 
 Mi poncho es un kimono flamenco (Sarita Cartonera, 2005) 
 El Descubrimiento de España (Nobel, 1996)
 Una declaración de humor (Bodegas Olarra & Café Bretón Prize, 2012), 
 Sevilla, sin mapa (Paréntesis, 2010), 
 La caja de pan duro (Signatura, 2000) 
 El sentimiento trágico de la Liga (Premio Fundación del Fútbol Profesional [Professional Football Foundation Prize], 1995).

History
 Extremo Oriente y Perú en el siglo XVI (Fundación Mapfre, 1992) 
 Nación Peruana: entelequia o utopía (Crese, 1998), 
 El comercio ambulatorio en Lima (co-author, ILD, 1989) 
 Jornadas contadas a Montilla (editor, 1996) 
 Francisco Solano, proceso diocesiano (editor, 2000),

References

1961 births
Living people
20th-century Peruvian historians
Peruvian emigrants to Spain
Peruvian novelists
Peruvian essayists
Peruvian male short story writers
Peruvian people of Japanese descent
Peruvian people of Italian descent
Peruvian people of Ecuadorian descent
Writers from Lima
University of Salamanca alumni
21st-century Peruvian historians